The 2001 Mercedes-Benz Cup was a men's tennis tournament played on outdoor hard courts at the Los Angeles Tennis Center in Los Angeles, California in the United States and was part of the International Series of the 2001 ATP Tour. The tournament ran from July 23 through July 29, 2001. Third-seeded Andre Agassi won the singles title.

Finals

Singles

 Andre Agassi defeated  Pete Sampras 6–4, 6–2
 It was Agassi's 4th title of the year and the 50th of his career.

Doubles

 Bob Bryan /  Mike Bryan defeated  Jan-Michael Gambill /  Andy Roddick 7–5, 7–6(8–6)
 It was Bob Bryan's 4th title of the year and the 4th of his career. It was Mike Bryan's 4th title of the year and the 4th of his career.

See also
 Agassi–Sampras rivalry

References

Mercedes-Benz Cup
Mercedes-Benz Cup
Mercedes-Benz Cup
Mercedes-Benz Cup
Los Angeles Open (tennis)